Ma Fang (born 25 January 1965) is a Chinese former volleyball player who competed in the 1992 Summer Olympics.

References

1965 births
Living people
Chinese women's volleyball players
Olympic volleyball players of China
Volleyball players at the 1992 Summer Olympics
People from Zhuji
Volleyball players from Zhejiang
Sportspeople from Shaoxing
20th-century Chinese women